Khushbu Sundar (born Nakhat Khan;  29 September 1970) is an Indian politician, actress, film producer and television presenter. She is known for her works predominantly in Tamil films. Acted in more than 100 Tamil films, she was one of the leading actress, and Super Star of Tamil cinema in 1980s and 1990s.

In Feb 2023, she became the first Indian actress, and the first person from any Indian film industry to be nominated as a member of National Commission for Women

Early life 
Khushbu was born as Nakhat Khan on 29 September 1970 into a Muslim family in Mumbai, Maharashtra, India. Her parents gave her the stage name Khushbu when she started her career as a child actress. She has been living in Chennai for nearly 40 years now.

Film career 
Khushbu started her career as a child artist in the Hindi film The Burning Train (1980) in the song "Teri Hai Zameen Tera Aasman". Between 1980 and 1985 she performed as a child actor in the Hindi films Naseeb, Laawaris, Kaalia, Dard Ka Rishta, and Bemisal.

Her Pari/Fairy song "Main Pariyon Ki Shehzaadi" from Dard Ka Rishta, a 1982 Hindi movie, was very successful and is still a highly popular song at annual Day School performances, children's parties and Pari/Fairy themed parties in India.

She made her adult role acting debut by playing a supporting role of Anil Kapoor's younger sister in much-acclaimed film Meri Jung in the year 1985. She danced with Javed Jaffrey in the famous song "Bol Baby Bol, Rock'n Roll" in this film. She played her first lead role in the film Jaanoo in the very same year and was cast opposite veteran actor Jackie Shroff in this film. She also starred in Tan-Badan (1986), opposite Govinda. Khushbu played a significant supporting role in Deewana Mujh Sa Nahin (1990), which also starred Aamir Khan and Madhuri Dixit.

Khushbu was introduced to South Indian screens through the Telugu film Kaliyuga Pandavulu (1986), opposite Venkatesh.

She then moved her base to Chennai and started focusing on Tamil and other South Indian film industries.

Prabhu and Khushbu rocked as the most loved pair in Tamil cinema during the nineties and almost all their films together were blockbuster hits including Dharmathin Thalaivan (1988), Vettri Vizhaa (1989), My Dear Marthandan (1990), Chinna Thambi (1991), Pandithurai (1992), Uthama Raasa (1993), Maravan (1993) and Chinna Vathiyar (1995).

Among regional South Indian films, she acted in over 100 Tamil films and became the most sought-after actresses of Tamil film industry. She in her illustrious acting career has worked alongside all the superstars of South Indian film industry. After sparkling through the '90s, the number of films reduced in the 2000s. Khushbu forayed into television, plunged into politics and had to take care of her children.

In 2021, she made a comeback with Rajinikanth in Annaatthe.

Popularity

Temple built for Khushbu 
During her peak, Khushbu was the leading actress of Tamil cinema. She became the first Indian actress for whom her fans built a dedicated temple.

Involvement with Australian Football 
Khushbu and sprinter Usain Bolt are honorary members of Richmond Football Club, based in Melbourne, Australia. Khushbu was made the number-one ticket holder of Richmond Football Club in 2016. She became the first Indian, and is the only Indian female to be bestowed with such an honour in the AFL.

Khushbu was introduced to Australian Rules Football by former Ministerial Adviser Mr. Nitin Gupta. She had agreed to help promote AFL Football in India after taking a guided tour of the Richmond Football Club. This offer was a goodwill gesture to further strengthen Australia–India relations.

Food dishes, products named after Khushbu 
During her peak in Tamil cinema, many dishes in Tamil Nadu were named after Khushbu. Kushboo Idli, a rice cake, was the most popular food item named after the actress. Kushboo Jhumki, Kushboo Sarees, Kushboo Sharbet, Kushboo Coffee, Kushboo Cocktails and various other food items were named after her. Many items still retain those names.

Offer to promote Little Indias in Melbourne 
Khushbu has offered to help in the promotion of Little India cultural precincts in Melbourne by becoming its Brand Ambassador.

Political career 
Khushbu joined the DMK on 14 May 2010. She was welcomed by DMK Leader Karunanidhi at the party headquarters in Chennai. Khushbu quit DMK on 16 June 2014.

Khushbu joined the Indian National Congress on 26 November 2014 after meeting with then Congress President Mrs. Sonia Gandhi, and then Vice-president Mr. Rahul Gandhi. She was the National Spokesperson of the INC. Kushbu was very critical of Narendra Modi's policies and has often taken to Twitter to criticise the ruling dispensation.

She resigned from Congress on 12 October 2020, and joined the Bharatiya Janata Party same day ahead of the Tamil Nadu Assembly elections in 2021. The congress secretary of Media said that Khushbu was being pressurized by her husband Sundar C to join the BJP. She claimed that her previous party "does not want an intelligent woman" and there is no freedom to speak the truth within the party and called the Congress as "mentally retarded". The National Platform for the Rights of the Disabled (NPRD) filed 30 complaints at different police stations in the state over her statements for allegedly making derogatory remarks against people with disabilities.

2021 Tamil Nadu assembly election 
The Bharatiya Janata Party has fielded Khushbu for the 2021 Tamil Nadu Legislative Assembly election from Thousand Lights constituency in Chennai. She lost the election by a margin of 32200 votes to Ezhilan N of Dravida Munnetra Kazhagam.

Social issues

Opposition by Hindutva groups 
Kushbu created a controversy in December 2012 when she wore a saree which had images of Hindu gods of Ram, Krishna and Hanuman. The Hindu Makkal Katchi demanded her for an apology and threatened to start agitations. She responded by saying that "I am not going to answer every Tom, Dick and Harry. Why should I? There is no need at all. Why are they worried about what a woman sports. Don't they have any other worthwhile work?".

The Hindu Munnani and the Hindu Makkal Katchi filed several cases against Khushbu, accusing the actress that she had disrespected Hindu gods by sitting cross-legged with her slippers in front of the idols of Goddesses Lakshmi, Sarswathy and Parvathy during 'pooja' for the muhurat at Chennai on 22 November 2007.

Support for jallikattu 
Khushbu has been a very vocal supporter of the bull-taming sport jallikattu, and has voiced her opinion at various national and international platforms. She even visited a cattle station in Warrnambool, Australia to get a better understanding of how cattle is treated, and raised on farms outside India.

Comments on pre-marital sex 
In 2005, she said in an interview it was fine for girls to indulge in pre-marital sex if they safeguard themselves and take precautions to prevent pregnancy and sexually transmitted diseases. Later, she justified her statement by saying no educated man could expect his partner to be a virgin. Dalit Panthers of India stormed the office of the South India Film Artistes' Association in Chennai demanding an apology from her. The Pattali Makkal Katchi said it will protest outside her house. 22 complaints that she was "defaming Tamil womanhood and chastity" were brought against her, but in 2010 the Supreme Court dismissed all cases.

Accusations against IFFM, Melbourne 
In August 2017, Khushbu accused Mitu Bhowmick Lange, the tender provider and director of Indian Film Festival of Melbourne (IFFM) of discriminating against non-Hindi films and film stars.

Khushbu has been very vocal about getting more recognition for South Indian cinema, and the non-Hindi cinema from India on global platforms and film festivals. She has always maintained that Indian cinema is not just about Bollywood movies.

Maxim morphed photo case 
In January 2006, in their first Indian edition, Maxim magazine featured a full-page composite photograph with her head pasted onto the body of a model wearing a bikini. Khushbu filed two complaints: defamation and the indecent representation of women against the editor and four others involved with the magazine. The proceedings were later stayed by the Madras High Court in December 2007 based on a plea filed by one of those charged.

Personal life 
She dated actor Prabhu while filming Chinna Thambi (1991). They had been in a live-in relationship for four and half years, they got married on September 12, 1993 at the house in Poes Garden that they had bought. Sivaji Ganesan, father of Prabhu, strictly opposed their relationship and finally Khushbu and Prabhu decided to break up their relationship and ended it within four months.

In 2000, she married film actor, director and producer Sundar C. She has been using the married name Khushbu Sundar since then. They have two daughters, Avantika and Anandita, after whom they named their production house, Avni Cinemax.

Khushbu added her husband's name Sundar to her name after marriage. In 2018, she was accused by BJP of hiding her name Nakhat Khan.

Filmography

References

External links 

 

Living people
1970 births
Indian film actresses
Actresses in Tamil cinema
Actresses in Telugu cinema
Actresses in Malayalam cinema
Tamil Nadu State Film Awards winners
Actresses in Kannada cinema
Actresses in Hindi cinema
20th-century Indian actresses
Actresses from Mumbai
21st-century Indian actresses
Indian atheists
Indian feminists
Indian television actresses
Actresses in Tamil television
Dravida Munnetra Kazhagam politicians
Indian National Congress politicians
Bharatiya Janata Party politicians from Tamil Nadu
Tamil television producers
Tamil television writers